Werner Ulrich (born 18 September 1940) is a former East German sprint canoer who competed in the early 1960s. He was born in Memel, East Prussia (today Klaipėda, Lithuania) and won a silver medal in the C-2 10000 m event at the 1963 ICF Canoe Sprint World Championships in Jajce.

Mehlberg also competed for the United Team of Germany at the 1960 Summer Olympics in Rome, finishing seventh in the C-2 1000 m event.

References

Sports-reference.com profile

1940 births
Canoeists at the 1960 Summer Olympics
German male canoeists
People from Klaipėda
People from East Prussia
Living people
Olympic canoeists of the United Team of Germany
ICF Canoe Sprint World Championships medalists in Canadian